Niedecken is a surname. Notable people with the surname include:

 George Mann Niedecken (1878–1945), American furniture designer and interior architect
 Junior Niedecken (born 1957), American stock car racing driver
 Wolfgang Niedecken (born 1951), German singer and musician